NCT 2020 Resonance is the second studio album by South Korean boy band NCT, an unlimited group project under the management of SM Entertainment. Similar to their previous release NCT 2018 Empathy, NCT 2020 Resonance is part of the "NCT 2020" project; which saw all current NCT members from several units collaborating on a full-length release. This time, the album features all 21 members from three current units of NCT; NCT 127, NCT Dream, and WayV, while introducing two new NCT members, namely Shotaro and Sungchan. The first part was released on October 12, 2020, and the second part was then released on November 23, 2020.

To promote the first part of the album, "Make A Wish" and "From Home" were released respectively as the first and second single, under the name of NCT U. "90's Love" and "Work It" were released as the two lead singles for the second part of the album.

The group promoted the album through music show performances and their own reality television series, NCT World 2.0. It was a commercial success for the group, becoming their first chart-topper on the Gaon Album Chart as NCT, and subsequently the group's first release to sell over a million copies without any repackage.

Background and release 
On September 15, 2020, it was announced that all current members of NCT would finally reunite as NCT 2020 following their first studio album, NCT 2018 Empathy, in 2018. A teaser video, titled "Interlude: Resonance," was released on September 20. The album's name, Resonance, was announced a day later, with the album to be released in two parts: the first would be released on October 12 while the second part would receive a November release in the same year. NCT groups NCT 127, NCT Dream, and WayV were confirmed to be part of Resonance, with WayV's Xiaojun, Hendery, and Yangyang officially being inducted in NCT through the project. Two new NCT members, Sungchan and Shotaro, would debut with Part 1s release, bringing the total number of members to 23. Pre-orders for the album began on September 21. Another teaser video, named "Year Party," was released the next day, which featured all members assembling. On September 23, the 23 members gathered in a V Live broadcast where Sungchan and Shotaro were officially introduced to the public.

In accordance to the album's release schedule, a short music video for NCT Dream's "Déjà Vu" was released on October 8, 2020, through the group's YouTube channel, with the music video for NCT U's "Misfit" released a day later. Along with its parental album, the music video for "Make a Wish (Birthday Song)" was then released on October 12, 2020, while the music video for "From Home" was released on October 19. The physical album comes in two versions: Past and Future, with different packages for the Korean edition and the international edition.

On November 9, SM Entertainment confirmed that the second part of the album would be released on November 23, 2020. Previously, during the announcement for Resonance Pt. 1, the company stated that the NCT 2020 Project would consist of two parts.

 Recording and production 
Member Doyoung revealed that producers would be in charge of selecting songs and which members would be recording them. Recording sessions took more than a month to conduct. Compared to Empathy, Taeyong is not the leader of the collective NCT 2020, saying, "I'm not actually the lead of NCT right now because the 22 other members are very awesome and these guys don't need a lead. So I'm not the leader of NCT. I just say, 'Hi, guys' and 'Hana dul set... [1, 2, 3...]' to start our greeting." Taeyong explained that Resonance marks as a progression of Empathy, explaining, "Our music is so different too, because now we are in the pandemic, and our lyrics mean we can overcome this right now, and we’re more confident and powerful. We are definitely more grown-up." He also described the various genres and styles the album featured, saying, "If you listen to our album, you’ll notice that obviously we have a more traditional kind of ballad, but we also have other tracks that are more old school and have that retro vibe."

The NCT U unit for "Make A Wish (Birthday Song)" consisted of Taeyong, Doyoung, Jaehyun, Lucas, Xiaojun, Jaemin, and Shotaro. The hip-hop dance track "Make A Wish (Birthday Song)" was co-written by rappers Penomeco and Damian, while music was composed by Sonny J Mason, Karen Poole, and Bobii Lewis. Korean and English versions of the song were included in the album, with Jaehyun explaining that these were recorded with international audiences in mind. Doyoung shared that the song "aims to give listeners a positive vibe and deliver positive energy," with the song's title and lyrics being a spin on making birthday wishes.

The sub-units of NCT each released a song for the album: "Déjà Vu" for NCT Dream, which served as Mark's return to the Dream unit; "Nectar" for WayV; and "Music, Dance" for NCT 127. Doyoung described "Music, Dance" as "energetic," saying, "I just remember having a lot of fun recording it, but we also trying to deliver the same energy when I recorded it. I remember kind of sweating it out actually in the studio." "Déjà Vu" is about the original seven Dream members reuniting, with Jaemin sharing, "The theme of the song was, 'Let’s go back on stage together.' It was great to be reunited again as seven and to be able to showcase that reunion on Resonance Pt. 1." Lucas and Xiaojun described WayV's song, "Nectar," as "sexy." Describing the recording process, Xiaojun explained that they "wanted to use that feeling — like bad boys with this very special juice." Instrumental "Interlude: Past to Present" was a favorite of some members, with Taeyong elaborating, "It explains NCT and kind of introduces the group within the music." The group that performed "From Home" included Taeil, Kun, Yuta, Doyoung, Renjun, Haechan and Chenle, and was performed in four languages - Korean, English, Mandarin Chinese and Japanese.

The lead single of part 2, "90's Love", is a new retro hip hop R&B song featuring Ten, Winwin, Mark, Jeno, Haechan, Yangyang, and Sungchan; its lyrics are about creating new and unique values. "Work It" is an electronic dance song recorded by Johnny, Yuta, Ten, Jungwoo, Hendery, Jaemin, and Jisung while "Raise The Roof", sung by Taeil, Yuta, Johnny, Kun, Jungwoo, Hendery, Renjun, Chenle, and Jisung, is a hip hop track that uses oriental instrumentations. "My Everything" contains a minimalist composition that features the vocals of Taeil, Xiaojun, and Renjun on a calm piano melody. "All About You", sung by Jaehyun, Jungwoo, Mark, Hendery, Shotaro, Sungchan, and Chenle, is a medium-tempo pop song that utilizes retro and modern bass sounds while "I.O.U" is a lo-fi hip hop track recorded by Taeyong, Kun, Doyoung, Yangyang, Shotaro, Chenle, Jisung. Two additional instrumental tracks are included: "Interlude: Present to Future" and "Outro: Dream Routine".

 Track listing 
Credits adapted from Naver.

Personnel
Credits adapted from Naver and QQ Music. Track listing is based on Resonance Pt. 2.

 Kenzievocal directing 
 Rick Ridgesvocal directing 
 Nodayvocal directing , Pro Tools operator 
 vocal directing 
 minGtionvocal directing , piano , digital editing 
 Maxx Song (ICONIC SOUNDS)vocal directing , Pro Tools operator 
 Hitchhickervocal directing , guitar and keyboards 
 Kim Boo-minvocal directing 
 Rick Ridgesvocal directing 
 Kim Dong-hyeonrap directing 
 NCTvocals, background vocals
 Taeilvocals , background vocals 
 Johnnyvocals 
 Taeyongvocals 
 Yutavocals 
 Kunvocals 
 Doyoungvocals , background vocals 
 Tenvocals , background vocals 
 Jaehyunvocals , background vocals 
 Winwinvocals 
 Jungwoovocals , background vocals 
 Lucasvocals 
 Markvocals 
 Xiaojunvocals 
 Henderyvocals 
 Renjunvocals , background vocals 
 Jenovocals , background vocals 
 Haechanvocals , background vocals 
 Jaeminvocals 
 Yangyangvocals , background vocals 
 Shotarovocals , narration 
 Sungchanvocals 
 Chenlevocals , background vocals 
 Jisungvocals 
 Jeremy "Tay" Jasperbackground vocals 
 Jayden Henrybackground vocals 
 Adrian McKinnonbackground vocals 
 Wilston Jordain Johnsonbackground vocals 
 Maurice Moorebackground vocals 
 Byeon Jang-moonbackground vocals 
 Sonny J. Masonbackground vocals 
 Bobii Lewisbackground vocals 
 JUNNYbackground vocals 
 Ninos Hannabackground vocals 
 Jisoo Park (153/Joombas)background vocals 
 Patrick "J. Que" Smithbackground vocals 
 Wilbart "Vedo" McCoy IIIbackground vocals 
 Zaysonbackground vocals , bass , keyboard and synth , drums and FX 
 Simon Petrénpiano 
 Andreas Öbergguitar 
 Jeong Yoonpiano 
 Lee Ji-hongrecording , additional recording , mix engineer , mixing engineer , digital editing 
 No Min-jirecording , additional recording , digital editing , mix engineer 
 Jung Ui-Seokrecording , mixing engineer 
 Kang Eun-jirecording , mix engineer , digital editing 
 Jang Woo-yeongrecording , digital editing 
 Kwon Yoo-jinadditional recording , recording , digital editing 
 Lee Min-gyudigital editing , mix engineer , mixing engineer 
 Jung Yuradigital editing 
 Jung Ho-jindigital editing 
 Kang Seon-yeongmix engineer 
 Goo Jong-pilmixing engineer 
 Kim Cheol-soonmixing engineer 
 Nam Goong-jinmixing engineer 
 Kim Chan-gumixing engineer 

LocationsRecording SM Big Shot Studio
 SM Yellow Tail Studio
 SM Blue Cup Studio
 SM SSAM Studio
 SM LVYIN Studio
 doobdoob studioEditing SM Yellow Tail Studio
 SM Big Shot Studio
 SM SSAM Studio
 SM LVYIN Studio
 doobdoob Studio
 Sound POOL StudiosMixing'
 SM Yellow Tail Studio
 SM Blue Cup Studio
 SM Big Shot Studio
 SM SSAM Studio
 SM LVYIN Studio
 SM Blue Ocean Studio
 SM Concert Hall Studio
 MonoTree Studio
 KLANG STUDIO
 Sound POOL Studios

Accolades

Charts

Weekly charts

Monthly charts

Year-end charts

Certifications and sales

Release history

Notes

References 

2020 albums
NCT (band) albums
SM Entertainment albums
Korean-language albums